Ziddi is a 1997 Indian action film directed by Guddu Dhanoa, starring Sunny Deol and Raveena Tandon. It follows a short-tempered and stubborn Deva, who is feared because of his ruthless ways and severe punishment to the local hoodlums and later avenges the death of his siblings.

It went on to become one of the biggest Bollywood hits of 1997, grossing Rs 292.5 million (US$5.4 million) at the box office. The film was remade in Tamil as Dharma, starring Vijayakanth.The 1998 Kannada movie One Man Army was an unofficial adaptation of this movie. The film also was remade in Bangladeshi in 1998 as Shanto Keno Mastan, starring Manna, Shahnaj and Humayun Faridi, directed by Montajur Rahman Akbar.

Plot

Deva (Sunny Deol), an angry young man, lives with his widower father advocate lawyer Ashok Pradhan (Anupam Kher), brother Akash (Sachin Khedekar) and sister Guddi (Richa Ahuja). He is greatly vigilant about the well-being of his family – an intrinsic reason of his fury and stubbornness. One day a man named Vilas tries to molest Guddi and forcefully grabs her hand. Deva, in a fit of extreme rage, rips off the hand of the man. Deva is arrested, and is sent to jail for 4 years.

After his liberation from jail, Deva with his henchmen form a tribunal of justice called "Deva Ki Adaalat", where he punishes the evil-doers, mostly the tyrants over the poor. Soon, Deva's name is filed as one of the top four criminals of the city, the other three being Jindaal (Raj Babbar), Laal Singh (Shahbaz Khan) and Khan (Sharat Saxena). These three men are in an effort to do away with Deva, who acts as an impediment to their illegal activities. Asst. Commissioner of Police Inder Saxena (Ashish Vidyarthi) has a genial relationship with Deva and his family, but is secretly planning to apprehend and punish him under legal task, in case adequate evidences are gathered by police against Deva. Concurrently, a club dancer Jaya (Raveena Tandon) falls for Deva.

In due course of time, Inder marries Guddi. One day, Akash stops at a building under construction erected by "Laal Builders" to deliver some goods. Incidentally, at the top floor of the building he eavesdrops the three crime bosses - Jindaal, Laal Singh and Khan devising an evil plot to kill the CM (Virendra Saxena) and frame Deva for the murder. In great panic, Akash flees from the spot but in the haste drops the cap of his pen on which the name "AKASH" is engraved. He reports this dreadful plot to Inder by phone after a failed attempt to call Deva. Inder arrives shortly and both of them walk up to the top of the building where the three men are abetting. Inder retains the pen-cap (which Akash dropped behind) and after an onslaught on Akash by Jindaal, Laal Singh and Khan, Inder slays Akash by throwing him off the building to avenge the death of his brother, whose hand Deva tore off.

One day, the CM comes to meet Deva after the latter convenes the CM for a private meeting. Jindaal bursts onto the scene, before Deva arrives and fires at the CM in a lethal attempt to assassinate him. However, Deva turns up in time and carries the acutely wounded CM to a safe location. A search operation is launched for Deva by the police. Deva kills Laal Singh in a heavy blood-shedding rout.

As the story advances, Inder's wife Guddi comes across Akash's pen-cap inside a drawer at their home, which leads her to learn with shock and horror that Inder killed Akash. She rings up Deva, but before she utters the truth, Inder arrives with Jindaal, and Khan and detaches the telephone cord. The three men assault Guddi before Inder stabs her to death.

Eventually, Deva tracks down Khan as one of the killers of his brother and kills him by stabbing Khan to death. Later, Deva finds Akash's pen-cap among Guddi's mortal remains. So the truth revealed to Deva that Inder has joined hands with Jindal.

A squad of policemen led by Inder besieges Deva's refuge. Jindaal arrives at the spot to kill the CM who is under vital medical treatment in Deva's shelter. Deva and his men with the help of the local residents annihilate the armed force. He kills Jindaal when the latter tries to fire at the CM, and beats up Inder. Finally, Deva's father Ashok Pradhan arrives and shoots Inder to death.

"Jaanwar ko maarne ke liye jaanwar banna padta hai" (To kill a beast, one has to become a beast) — the honest advocate upholds.

In the final scene, the CM asserts Deva's innocence. Deva is sentenced to seven years in jail.

Cast
Sunny Deol as Deva Pradhan
Raveena Tandon as Jaya Pradhan
Anupam Kher as Advocate Ashok Pradhan
Farida Jalal as Kamla
Ashish Vidyarthi as ACP Inder Kumar Saxena
Raj Babbar as The Main Antagonist, Jindaal
Sharat Saxena as The Main Antagonist, Khan
Sachin Khedekar as Akash Pradhan, Deva's younger brother.
Richa Ahuja as Guddi
Virendra Saxena as Chief Minister
Shahbaz Khan as The Main Antagonist, Laal Singh
Mushtaq Khan as Laal Singh's henchman
Dhananjay Manjrekar as Deva's henchman

Box office
Ziddi was successful at the box office, with a net collection of Rs 292.5 million. The movie flourished particularly in north India. The songs were well-received, with the dandy number "Mera Dil Le Gayi Oye" becoming extremely popular.

Soundtrack
The album has seven songs in the vocals of Hariharan, Chithra, Lalit Sen, Udit Narayan, Kumar Sanu, Shweta Shetty and Alka Yagnik. Sameer Sen-Dilip Sen composed the music for the album which was acclaimed by the audience. Besides "Mera Dil Le Gayi Oye" with Punjabi dash and touch, the song "Hum Tumse Na Kuch Keh Paaye" became popular as a soft romantic ballad. The other songs, in addition, became appealing.

The Ziddi soundtrack album sold 2.2million units in India, making it one of the year's top ten best-selling Bollywood soundtrack albums.

Track list

Reviews
The movie, by and large, received favourable reviews from various analysis sources. Sunny Deol's role as a placid  Angry Young Man was highly acclaimed. He had performed similar roles in previous smash hits like Ghayal, Damini and Ghatak.

References

Mamta Kulkarni was offered the lead role, but declined. Mithun Chakraborthy was signed for Sunny Deol's role, but opted out later.

External links

1990s Hindi-language films
1997 films
1997 action films
1990s vigilante films
Indian action films
Hindi films remade in other languages
Films scored by Dilip Sen-Sameer Sen
Indian vigilante films
Indian gangster films
Films scored by Surinder Sodhi
Fictional portrayals of police departments in India
Hindi-language action films
Films directed by Guddu Dhanoa